The service-oriented computing environment (SORCER) is a distributed computing platform implemented in Java. It allows writing network-programs (called "exertions") that operate on wrapped applications (services) to spread across the network. SORCER is often utilized in scenarios similar to those where grids are used (grid computing) in order to run parallel tasks.

SORCER's predecessor was the federated intelligent product environment (FIPER), which was software for a GE aircraft-engine-design project funded from 1999 to 2003 by the National Institute of Standards and Technology's Advanced Technology Program.  The project followed the principal investigator, and thus SORCER Labs was founded in November 2002 at Texas Tech University (TTU); SORCER core's source code was made public in 2013 under the open source Apache license.  SORCER (and FIPER) were developed at GE from 1994 to 2002, at TTU through 2009, and since then at the United States Air Force Research Laboratory (AFRL).  Other groups which have made use of SORCER include Beijing Jiaotong University in China, Cranfield University in the United Kingdom, and Ulyanovsk State University in Russia.

Overview
SORCER is a computing platform that allows the end user to program dynamic front-end compound services, called exertions, bound at runtime by the SORCER OS (SOS) to federations of service providers as new back-end dynamic services.  The SOS utilizes the service object-orient architecture (SOOA) and a federated method invocation. The front-end services created by the end users are service collaborations of users' applications, tools, and utilities with their data and corresponding control strategies. The end users in understandable domain specific languages (DSL) define only their service-oriented process expressions and the SOS makes that process expressions actualized by the corresponding dynamic service federations in the network.

SORCER is a federated service-oriented platform with a front-end federated service-oriented programming environment, a matching operating system, and a federated virtual processor. The architecture of SORCER is based on the concept: Everything Anywhere Anytime As a Service (EaaaS). Therefore, the end user service requests (front-end expression) as well service providers (back-end federations) are treated as services. SORCER is the first platform that created front-end service-oriented mogramming (programming or modeling or both) as the key element of its federated service orientation. SORCER mograms are called exertions. The exertion-oriented programming has its roots in the FIPER project. An exertion as the front-end service composition defined by the user is bound by the SORCER OS (SOS) to service providers (local and/or remote) to form a matching collaborative service federation at runtime - a virtual service processor of the SORCER platform.

SORCER Operating System

The SORCER Operating System (SOS) manages execution of front-end service-oriented mograms and related resources including required service providers. The SOOA kernel by itself is the service-oriented system made up of system service providers architecturally equivalent to domain specific service providers. A service provider is a container for service beans that is responsible for deploying services in the network, publishing their proxies to registries, and allowing the SOS to access proxies of deployed providers. Providers maintain their availability in the network continuously by renewing leases for their registered object proxies; registries intercept these announcements and cache/remove proxy objects per providers’ requests. The SOS looks up proxies by sending queries to registries and making selections from the currently available providers or provisions on-demand required ones. Queries generally contain search criteria related to the type and quality of service. Registries facilitate searching by storing proxy objects of services and making them available to the SOS. Providers use discovery/join protocols to publish services in the network and the SOS uses discovery/join protocols to discover registries and lookup proxies in those registries.

Applications
The basic exertion-oriented platform was developed at GE Global Research Center with the partners of the FIPER project (1999-2003). FIPER was used at that time to design aircraft engines. The Multidisciplinary Science and Technology Center, the United States Air Force Research Laboratory/WPAFB is using SORCER to address the physics-based distributed collaborative design for aerospace vehicle development. SORCER was selected for comparative study of evolutionary computing of optimization techniques at the Cranfield University, UK. In China, SORCER is used as noise mapping platform for urban traffic, a resource integration platform, engineering collaborative design and manufacturing environment, and at the Wright State University as a collaborative computational framework for multidisciplinary and reliability-based analysis and optimization.

History 
SORCER follows up on the FIPER project (1999-2003) - funded by National Institute of Standards and Technology Advanced Technology Program. The FIPER software environment was developed and demonstrated at the GE Global Research Center (Chief software architect and lead developer Michael Sobolewski  and engineering application development led by R. Kolonay) in collaboration with GE Aviation (Cincinnati, OH), Goodrich Corporation Aerostructures Group (Chula Vista, CA), Parker Hannifin Corporation (Mentor, OH), Engineous Software, Inc. (Cary, NC) and Ohio University (Athens, OH). When the project was finished M. Sobolewski established the SORCER Laboratory at Texas Tech University (2002-2009) where he continued his FIPER-based research. The SORCER Laboratory was partially funded by General Electric, Texas Tech University, Sun Microsystems, Air Force Research Laboratory, and others. During that time 28 graduate research studies (M.S. and Ph.D.) were completed all of which contributed to the development of the SORCER platform and the foundations of federated service-oriented computing. In the meantime, a number of collaborative SORCER-based projects (2007-2010) were realized together with universities from other countries (Beijing Jiaotong University, China; Beihang University, China; Ulyanovsk State University and Samara State Aerospace University, Russia).

Since 2008 M. Sobolewski continues his SORCER applied research at the Multidisciplinary Science and Technology Center, Air Force Research Laboratory/WPAFB and starting in 2010 simultaneously at the Polish Japanese Institute of Information Technology. In 2010 the SORCER Laboratory became an independent research organization focused on the development federated service-oriented computing.

Since 2013 the development of SORCER is continued simultaneously by Sorcersoft.com in cooperation with the Polish-Japanese Institute of Information Technology and SMT Software.

Notes

References

External links 
 SORCER Laboratory, TTU
 SORCER Project
 SORCERsoft.com S.A.

Java enterprise platform
Java platform